Bottrop is a city in west-central Germany, on the Rhine–Herne Canal, in North Rhine-Westphalia. Located in the Ruhr industrial area, Bottrop adjoins Essen, Oberhausen, Gladbeck, and Dorsten. The city had been a coal-mining and rail center and contains factories producing coal-tar derivatives, chemicals, textiles, and machinery. Bottrop grew as a mining center beginning in the 1860s, was chartered as a city in 1921, and bombed during the Oil Campaign of World War II. In 1975, it unified with the neighbouring communities of Gladbeck and Kirchhellen, but Gladbeck left it in 1976, leading to Kirchhellen becoming a district of Bottrop as Bottrop-Kirchhellen. It is also twinned with Blackpool, England.

Boroughs

Bottrop is divided into three boroughs: Bottrop-Mitte (Bottrop-Center), Bottrop-Süd (Bottrop South) and Bottrop-Kirchhellen, each having a borough representation and a borough ruler.

These boroughs are further subdivided into city parts, partly named after their traditional names, while the newly built parts are only recently named:

Bottrop-Mitte: Eigen, Fuhlenbrock, Stadtmitte, and Marktviertel
Bottrop-Süd: Batenbrock, Boy, Ebel, Lehmkuhle, Vonderort, Gartenstadt Welheim (Garden city Welheim), and Welheimer Mark 
Bottrop-Kirchhellen: Ekel, Feldhausen, Grafenwald, Hardinghausen, Holthausen, Im Loh, Kirchhellen, Kuhberg, and Overhagen

For statistical reasons, Bottrop is also divided into statistical boroughs. They are (with their official numbering):

Kirchhellen
From 1919 until 1976, Kirchhellen was its own town. Following a communal reorganization reform in 1975, both Kirchhellen and Gladbeck joined the city of Bottrop. This resulted in the nickname "GlaBotKi". Gladbeck left the city in 1976, and became part of the district of Recklinghausen.

Most of Kirchhellen is Catholic (around 65%). It has three churches, including one Lutheran church.

Politics

Mayor
The current Mayor of Bottrop is Bernd Tischler of the Social Democratic Party (SPD) since 2009. The most recent mayoral election was held on 13 September 2020, and the results were as follows:

! colspan=2| Candidate
! Party
! Votes
! %
|-
| bgcolor=| 
| align=left| Bernd Tischler
| align=left| Social Democratic Party
| 31,795
| 73.1
|-
| bgcolor=| 
| align=left| Andrea Swoboda
| align=left| Alliance 90/The Greens
| 4,117
| 9.5
|-
| bgcolor=| 
| align=left| Andreas Bucksteeg
| align=left| Free Democratic Party
| 3,023
| 7.0
|-
| bgcolor=| 
| align=left| Michael Gerber
| align=left| German Communist Party
| 2,071
| 4.8
|-
| bgcolor=| 
| align=left| Marianne Dominas
| align=left| Ecological Democratic Party
| 1,334
| 3.1
|-
| bgcolor=| 
| align=left| Günter Blocks
| align=left| The Left
| 1,153
| 2.7
|-
! colspan=3| Valid votes
! 43,493
! 97.5
|-
! colspan=3| Invalid votes
! 1,114
! 2.5
|-
! colspan=3| Total
! 44,607
! 100.0
|-
! colspan=3| Electorate/voter turnout
! 92,241
! 48.4
|-
| colspan=5| Source: State Returning Officer
|}

City council

The Bottrop city council governs the city alongside the Mayor. The most recent city council election was held on 13 September 2020, and the results were as follows:

! colspan=2| Party
! Votes
! %
! +/-
! Seats
! +/-
|-
| bgcolor=| 
| align=left| Social Democratic Party (SPD)
| 17,668
| 40.2
|  7.4
| 24
|  2
|-
| bgcolor=| 
| align=left| Christian Democratic Union (CDU)
| 10,513
| 23.9
|  3.2
| 14
|  1
|-
| bgcolor=| 
| align=left| Alliance 90/The Greens (Grüne)
| 5,639
| 12.8
|  7.4
| 8
|  5
|-
| bgcolor=| 
| align=left| Alternative for Germany (AfD)
| 3,076
| 7.0
|  5.2
| 4
|  3
|-
| bgcolor=| 
| align=left| Ecological Democratic Party (ÖDP)
| 1,856
| 4.2
|  0.4
| 2
|  1
|-
| bgcolor=| 
| align=left| German Communist Party (DKP)
| 1,832
| 4.2
|  0.2
| 2
| ±0
|-
| bgcolor=| 
| align=left| Free Democratic Party (FDP)
| 1,821
| 4.1
|  1.5
| 2
|  1
|-
| bgcolor=| 
| align=left| The Left (Die Linke)
| 1,507
| 3.4
|  0.7
| 2
| ±0
|-
! colspan=2| Valid votes
! 43,912
! 98.5
! 
! 
! 
|-
! colspan=2| Invalid votes
! 672
! 1.5
! 
! 
! 
|-
! colspan=2| Total
! 44,584
! 100.0
! 
! 58
!  4
|-
! colspan=2| Electorate/voter turnout
! 92,241
! 48.3
!  0.2
! 
! 
|-
| colspan=7| Source: State Returning Officer
|}

Culture and attractions

Theaters, museums, and buildings
 Main Post Office, constructed 1921-1923
 The Quadrat is a museum housing permanent exhibitis on local history and displaying works by Josef Albers and many temporary exhibitions.
 City Hall (Neo-Renaissance 1910–1916) is regarded as the emblem of the city.
 Schloss Beck theme park and castle (late baroque period 1766–1777)
 Villa Dickmann, constructed 1901–1903 (art nouveau)
 Alte Apotheke (Old Pharmacy, Wilhelminian style 1895)
 Catholic churches
 Heilige Familie
 Heilig Kreuz, built 1955–57, windows by Georg Meistermann
 Herz Jesu, built 1929
 Liebfrauen 
 St. Antonius
 St. Barbara
 St. Bonifatius
 St. Cyriakus, Propstei, built 1861/62 by Emil von Manger
 St. Elisabeth, built 1954
 St. Franziskus
 St. Johannes Baptist (BOT-Boy)
 St. Johannes der Täufer (BOT-Kirchhellen)
 St. Joseph
 St. Ludger
 St. Mariä Himmelfahrt
 St. Matthias
 St. Michael
 St. Paul
 St. Peter
 St. Pius
 St. Suitbert, built 1955
 Protestant churches
 Auferstehungskirche
 Friedenskirche
 Gnadenkirche
 Martin-Niemöller-Kirche 
 Martinskirche, erbaut 1884
 Paul-Gerhardt-Kirche
 Pauluskirche 
 Malakow-Turm (1872) of the coal mine Prosper II
 Coal Mining Tip Haniel with an open-air theater (Amphitheater) and the Kreuzweg designed by Tisa von der Schulenburg and Adolf Radecki and opened in 1995.
 Saalbau, convention center

Attractions
 Alpincenter - the world's longest indoor ski slope 
 Tetraeder is a 50-m-tall walkable steel tetrahedron, placed on a 90-m slag heap.  It has been the town's landmark since its construction in 1995.
 Movie Park Germany - theme park (in Bottrop-Kirchhellen)
 Schloss Beck is a castle turned into an amusement park (in Bottrop-Kirchhellen).
 Indoor Skydiving Bottrop, a powerful vertical wind tunnel, attracts skydivers from all over Europe.
 Since September 12, 2005, so called Stolpersteine have been placed by artist Gunter Demnig all over the city in remembrance of the people deported and killed by the Nazis.

Periodic events
January: Festival Orgel PLUS (music festival started in 1989) 
February: Rose Monday Parade and Carnival
May: Horse Market
May: Asparagus - Farmers' Market in Kirchhellen
Brezelfest (Pretzel Festival) in Kirchhellen
May/June/July: Schützenfeste (marksmen festivals) of Bottrops marksmen companies (BSV Bottrop Batenbrock, BSV Bottrop Eigen, BSV Bottrop Fuhlenbrock, BSV Bottrop Vonderort, BSV Andreas Hofer, Alte Allgemeine Bürgerschützengesellschaft, BSV Bottrop Boy)
September: Michaelismarket

Religion
 Catholic: 50% (19 churches)
 Protestant (Lutheran): 20% (8 churches)
 Atheist/agnostic: 20%
 Muslim: 2%

Notable people
 Josef Albers (1888–1976), painter, graphic artist, designer, art teacher 
 August Everding (1928–1999), director of the Hamburgische Staatsoper 1973–77, general director of the Bavarian State Theater rector
 Sabine Gaudzinski-Windheuser (born 1965), archaeologist
 Paul Holz (1952–2017), football player
 Martin Honert (born 1953), artist, professor at the Dresden Academy of Fine Arts
 Da Hool (born 1968), DJ and music producer
 Theo Jörgensmann (born 1948), jazz musician and composer
 Gisela Kinzel (born 1961), athlete and Olympian
 Ulla Kock am Brink (born 1961), television presenter
 Bernhard Korte (born 1938), mathematician and computer scientist
 Werner Münch (born 1940), politician (CDU), prime minister of Saxony-Anhalt (1991–1993)
 Christian Scheuß (born 1966), journalist and writer
 Claus Spahn (born 1940), journalist and author
 Andy Vine (1948–1985), author and poet

Twin towns – sister cities

Bottrop is twinned with:
 Blackpool, England, United Kingdom (1980)
 Gliwice, Poland (2007)
 Merseburg, Germany (1989)
 Mitte (Berlin), Germany (1983)
 Tourcoing, France (1967)
 Veszprém, Hungary (1987)

References

External links

 
Cities in North Rhine-Westphalia